Associação de Cultura e Recreio de Gulpilhares is a Rink Hockey team from Vila Nova de Gaia, Portugal.

External links

Rink hockey clubs in Portugal